FOB MacKenzie formerly FOB Pacesetter (Samarra East Air Base under Saddam Hussein) was a U.S. Army Forward Operating Base that is located in northern Iraq approximately 96 kilometers (60 mi) north of Baghdad, and about 12 kilometers (7.5 mi) northeast of the Tigris River.

History

FOB MacKenzie occupies an 18-square-kilometer (7 sq mi) site and is protected by an 18-kilometer (11 mi) security perimeter. According to the "Gulf War Air Power Survey", there were 12 hardened aircraft shelters at FOB MacKenzie in 1991. At each end of the main runway are hardened aircraft shelters knowns as "trapezoids" or "Yugos" which were built by Yugoslavian contractors some time prior to 1985.

FOB MacKenzie is named for Ranald S. Mackenzie.

Current use

See also
 List of United States Military installations in Iraq

References

External links
Soldiers in Iraq Make Comfortable Home at FOB McKenzie
FOB MacKenzie soldiers create a recreational oasis in Iraqi desert
http://www.airliners.net/photo//1906884/L/&sid=fd167d20c8837e804f80e65a2d7b6dcf

Installations of the United States Army in Iraq
Military installations closed in the 2010s